Hugo Guillamón Sanmartín (born 31 January 2000) is a Spanish professional footballer who plays as a central defender or midfielder for La Liga club Valencia and the Spain national team.

He came through the youth ranks at Valencia, where he made his first-team debut in 2020. He made his senior international debut for Spain in 2021 and was chosen for the 2022 FIFA World Cup.

Club career
Born in San Sebastián, Gipuzkoa, Basque Country, Guillamón moved to L'Eliana, Valencian Community at the age of two. He made his senior debut with the reserves on 16 December 2017, coming on as a first-half substitute for Ivan Zotko in a 0–0 Segunda División B home draw against CF Badalona.

On 23 December 2017, Guillamón renewed his contract with the Che until 2020. The following 27 October he scored his first senior goal, netting the opener in a 3–2 home loss against CD Alcoyano.

Guillamón made his first team – and La Liga – debut on 22 February 2020, replacing injured Eliaquim Mangala at half-time in a 3–0 defeat away to Real Sociedad. On 22 July, he renewed his contract until 2023, being definitely promoted to the main squad. He scored his first goal for the team on 22 November in a 2–2 draw at Deportivo Alavés.

On 13 August 2021, in the first game of the season at home to Getafe CF, Guillamón fouled Nemanja Maksimović after 39 seconds. After consulting the video assistant referee, his third-minute dismissal was the earliest on a La Liga opening weekend; his team nonetheless won 1–0.

Guillamón started in the 2022 Copa del Rey Final, being substituted in the 85th minute as Valencia lost on penalties to Real Betis. On 3 October that year, he extended his contract to last until June 2026.

International career
Guillamón represented Spain at under-17 and under-19 levels, having won the 2017 UEFA European Under-17 Championship for the former and 2019 UEFA European Under-19 Championship for the latter.

Due to the isolation of some national team players following the positive COVID-19 test of Sergio Busquets, Spain's under-21 squad were called up for the international friendly against Lithuania on 8 June 2021. Guillamón made his senior debut in the match and scored in the 3rd minute of their 4–0 win.

Guillamón was chosen for the 2022 FIFA World Cup in Qatar. He took no part in Spain's four matches, and the side were eliminated in the last 16 by Morocco.

Personal life
As of November 2022, Guillamón was combining his professional football career with a degree in biomedical engineering from the Technical University of Valencia.

Career statistics

Club

International

Scores and results list Spain's goal tally first, score column indicates score after each Guillamón goal.

Honours
Spain U17
UEFA European Under-17 Championship: 2017

Spain U19
UEFA European Under-19 Championship: 2019

References

External links

Profile at the Valencia CF website

2000 births
Living people
Footballers from San Sebastián
Spanish footballers
Footballers from the Valencian Community
People from Camp de Túria
Sportspeople from the Province of Valencia
Association football defenders
Spain international footballers
Spain youth international footballers
Spain under-21 international footballers
La Liga players
Segunda División B players
Valencia CF Mestalla footballers
Valencia CF players
2022 FIFA World Cup players